This is a list of Alvin and the Chipmunks television specials and home video releases.

VHS releases 
Following the Lorimar Home Video successful release of The Chipmunk Adventure movie on VHS, selected episodes of the 1983 show and 1980s and 1990s specials were also released. In 1988, New Age Video distributed them, then by Buena Vista Home Video from 1991 to 1996, and Universal Studios Home Video from 1998 to 2000. The VHS Chipmunk Video Library titles featured no opening and closing credits (even though the opening credits were intact on A Chipmunk Reunion).

However, unlike the syndicated versions for most of these were presented in their original speed. The early-mid-1990s Chipmunk VHS releases featured select episodes from the DiC era. The Universal Home Video releases consisted of the reissue of The Chipmunk Adventure and the two direct-to-video films.

 The Chipmunk Adventure (released by Lorimar Home Video in 1987, folded into Warner Home Video in 1992; Celebrity's Just for Kids Home Video in 1993; Universal Studios Home Video in 1998; Paramount Home Entertainment in April 1, 2008)

New Age Video (1988) 

 Alvin and the Chipmunks in Alvin and the Chipettes
 The Greatest Showoffs on Earth
 Sisters
 Tell It to the Judge
 Alvin and the Chipmunks in Chipmunk Classics
 Snow Wrong
 Cinderella? Cinderella!
 Alvin and the Chipmunks in Chipmunkmania
 Every Chipmunk Tells a Story
 Who Ghost There?
 A Horse, of Course
 Alvin and the Chipmunks in The Chipmunk Family Tree
 The Chipmunk Story (Parts 1 and 2)
 A Chipmunk Reunion
 Around the World with Alvin and the Chipmunks
 Maids in Japan
 Alvie's Angels
 The Mystery of Seville Manor
 Alvin and the Chipmunks in Alvin's Wildest Schemes
 Romancing Miss Stone
 Snow Job
 A Chip off the Old Tooth

Buena Vista Home Video (1991–1996) 

 Little Audrey: Dexter Detention (1991)
 Little Audrey in Dexter Detention
 Alvin and the Chipmunks in A Chipmunk Christmas (originally released by New Age Video in 1988; Buena Vista Home Video in 1992)
 A Chipmunk Christmas
 Alvin and the Chipmunks: Rockin' With the Chipmunks: Featuring Michael Jackson (1992)
 The Chipmunks: Rockin' Through the Decades
 Alvin and the Chipmunks: It's a Wonderful Life, Dave (1993)
 Dave's Wonderful Life
 Alvin and the Chipmunks: Alvin's Christmas Carol (1993)
 Merry Christmas, Mr. Carroll
 Alvin and the Chipmunks: Love Potion #9 (1994)
 Theodore and Juliet
 Dr. Simon and Mr. Heartthrob
 Dear Diary
 Alvin and the Chipmunks Sing-Alongs: Video Audio Fun-Pack Ragtime Cowboy Joe (11 songs from The Alvin Show, 1994)
 Alvin and the Chipmunks Sing-Alongs: Video Audio Fun-Pack Working on the Railroad (11 songs from The Alvin Show, 1994)
 Alvin and the Chipmunks: School's Out for Summer (1994)
 Alvin's Summer Job (a.k.a. Going For Broke)
 Thinking Cap Trap
 Alvin and the Chipmunks: Hair-Raising Chipmunk Tales (1994)
 Babysitter Fright Night
 Theodore's Life as a Dog
 Unfair Science
 Alvin and the Chipmunks: Nightmare on Seville Street (1994)
 Nightmare on Seville Street
 No Chipmunk is an Island
 Psychic Alvin
 Alvin and the Chipmunks Go to the Movies: Back to Alvin's Future (1994)
 Back to Our Future
 Alvin and the Chipmunks Go to the Movies: Kong! (1994)
 Kong!
 Alvin and the Chipmunks Go to the Movies: Batmunk (1994)
 Batmunk
 Alvin and the Chipmunks Go to the Movies: Funny, We Shrunk the Adults (1994)
 Funny, We Shrunk the Adults
 Alvin and the Chipmunks: The Easter Chipmunk (1995)
 The Easter Chipmunk
 Alvin and the Chipmunks Go to the Movies: Daytona Jones and the Pearl of Wisdom (1995)
 Daytona Jones and the Pearl of Wisdom
 Alvin and the Chipmunks Go to the Movies: Robomunk (1995)
 Robomunk
 Alvin and the Chipmunks: Trick or Treason (1995)
 Trick or Treason
 Alvin and the Chipmunks: A Chipmunk Celebration (1995)
 A Chipmunk Celebration
 Alvin and the Chipmunks Go to the Movies: Bigger! (1996)
 Bigger!
 Alvin and the Chipmunks Go to the Movies: Star Wreck: The Absolutely Final Frontier (1996)
 Star Wreck: The Absolutely Final Frontier

Universal Studios Home Video (1999–2000) 

 Alvin and the Chipmunks Meet Frankenstein (September 28, 1999)
 Alvin and the Chipmunks Meet the Wolfman (August 29, 2000)

Some U.K. VHS releases have yet to be released in the U.S. on DVD. Episodes consists: "The Phantom", "The Wall", "Queen of the High School Ballroom", "Alvin's Not So Superhero", "Home Sweet Home", "All Worked Up" and "Phantom of the Rock Opera".

There was also a VHS tape released exclusively in Germany that featured seven different segments (albeit in German). On it were "The Wall", "The Amazing Chipmunks", "Psychic Alvin", "A Special Kind of Champion", "Cookie Chomper III", "Nightmare on Seville Street" and "Thinking Cap Trap". Of the seven, "The Amazing Chipmunks", which originally aired alongside "The Wall", is extremely hard to find in its original English language version.

DVD releases 
In 2005, Bagdasarian Productions struck a deal with Paramount Home Entertainment to distribute their latest direct-to-video release, Little Alvin and the Mini-Munks, on DVD. So, Paramount continued distributing selected episodes from the 1980's/1990's series and specials. However, Universal Studios Home Entertainment released Alvin and the Chipmunks Meet Frankenstein and Alvin and the Chipmunks Meet the Wolfman (which still owns the rights to these specials). 20th Century Studios Home Entertainment (formerly 20th Century Fox Home Entertainment still owns the home video rights through Walt Disney Studios Home Entertainment. The DVD releases include episodes of the 1980s Alvin and the Chipmunks animated series (previously released on VHS) and unreleased on a home video format.

Universal Studios Home Entertainment (2004; 2008) 
Monster Bash Fun Pack (Alvin and the Chipmunks Meet Frankenstein / Alvin and the Chipmunks Meet the Wolfman / Monster Mash / Archie & the Riverdale Vampires) 
 Alvin and the Chipmunks Meet Frankenstein (September 7, 2004)
 Alvin and the Chipmunks Meet the Wolfman (September 4, 2007)
Alvin and the Chipmunks: Scare-riffic Double Feature: Alvin and the Chipmunks Meet Frankenstein & Alvin and the Chipmunks Meet the Wolfman (March 11, 2008)

Paramount Home Entertainment (2005–2013) 
 Little Alvin and the Mini-Munks (2005)
Alvin and the Chipmunks: A Chipmunk Christmas (2005 and 2008)
 A Chipmunk Christmas
 Merry Christmas, Mr. Carroll
 Dave's Wonderful Life
 The Chipmunk Adventure (2006, 2008 (2008 reissue includes bonus CD); released on Blu-ray and DVD combo pack in 2014)
 The Brave Chipmunks (2014 re-release)
 Alvin and the Chipmunks: Trick or Treason (2006 and 2008)
 Trick or Treason
 Babysitter Fright Night
 Theodore's Life as a Dog
 Nightmare on Seville Street
 No Chipmunk Is An Island
 Alvin and the Chipmunks: A Chipmunk Christmas: 25th Anniversary Edition (2006)
 Same as the previous release, except with a bonus CD.
 Alvin and the Chipmunks: A Chipmunk Valentine (2007, 2009, and 2012)
 I Love the Chipmunks Valentine Special
 Dr. Simon and Mr. Heartthrob
 Dear Diary
 Theodore and Juliet
 Sploosh (2012 re-release)
 I Wish I Could Speak French (2012 re-release)
 Alvin and the Chipmunks: The Chipmunks Go to the Movies (2007)
 Star Wreck: The Absolutely Final Frontier
 Batmunk
 Funny, We Shrunk the Adults
 Little Audrey: Dexter Detention (2007)
 Little Audrey in Dexter Detention
 Audrey the Magician
 Daffy Duck Driving
 Alvin and the Chipmunks Go to the Movies: Funny, We Shrunk the Adults (April 1, 2008)
 Funny, We Shrunk the Adults
 Back to Our Future
 Bigger
 Alvin and the Chipmunks Go to the Movies: Daytona Jones and the Pearl of Wisdom (September 9, 2008)
 Daytona Jones and the Pearl of Wisdom
 Batmunk
 Robomunk
 Alvin and the Chipmunks: The Alvinnn!!! Edition (September 16, 2008)
 The Curse of Lontiki
 Mr. Fabulous
 Unidentified Flying Chipmunk
 A Horse, of Course
 New Improved Simon
 Snow Job
 Maids in Japan
 Every Chipmunk Tells a Story
 Romancing Miss Stone
 Three Alarm Alvin
 Alvin's Oldest Fan
 A Chip Off the Old Tooth
 Whatever Happened to Dave Seville?
 Cadet's Regrets
 Alvin and the Chipmunks: Alvin's Thanksgiving Celebration (September 23, 2008)
 A Chipmunk Celebration
 Food for Thought
 Cookie Chomper III
 Dave's Getting Married
 Alvin and the Chipmunks: Classic Holiday Gift Set (September 23, 2008)
 Includes all the episodes from the DVDs Trick or Treason, Alvin's Thanksgiving Celebration, and A Chipmunk Christmas
 Alvin and the Chipmunks: The Chipettes (January 13, 2009)
 May the Best Chipmunk Win
 Operation: Theodore
 Sisters
 The Greatest Show-Offs on Earth
 My Fair Chipette
 Tell It to the Judge
 Alvin and the Chipmunks: The Mystery of the Easter Chipmunk (February 10, 2009)
 The Easter Chipmunk
 Snow Wrong
 Luck o' the Chipmunks
 A Special Kind of Champion
 Thinking Cap Trap
 Alvin and the Chipmunks Go to the Movies: Star Wreck (September 8, 2009)
 Star Wreck: The Absolutely Final Frontier
 Elementary, My Dear Simon
 Chip Tracy
 Alvin and the Chipmunks: The Very First Alvin Show (September 8, 2009)
 Episode No. 1 of The Alvin Show
 A Chipmunk Reunion
 The Chipmunks: Rockin' Through the Decades
 Alvin and the Chipmunks: Alvin and the Chipettes in Cinderella, Cinderella (March 30, 2010)
 Cinderella? Cinderella!
 Alvie's Angels
 The Brunch Club
 Alvin and the Chipmunks: Driving Dave Crazy (December 6, 2011)
 Dave's Getting Married
 Every Chipmunk Tells a Story
 Romancing Miss Stone
 Maids in Japan
 The Incredible Shrinking Dave
 Mother's Day
 The Chipette Diaries (March 13, 2012)
 Alvie's Angels
 Tell it to the Judge
 My Fair Chipette
 May the Best Chipmunk Win
 The Greatest Show-Offs on Earth
 The Chipettes
 Alvin and the Chipmunks: Batmunk (July 10, 2012)
 Batmunk
 Treasure Island
 Elementary, My Dear Simon
 Alvin and the Chipmunks: Halloween Collection (September 4, 2012)
 Trick or Treason
 Babysitter Fright Night
 Theodore's Life as a Dog
 Nightmare on Seville Street
 Once Upon a Crime
 Alvin and the Chipmunks: Easter Collection (February 19, 2013)
 The Easter Chipmunk
 A Special Kind of Champion
 Thinking Cap Trap
 The Picture of Health
 Snow Wrong
 Luck o' the Chipmunks
 The Chipettes: The Glass Slipper Collection (May 14, 2013)
 Cinderella? Cinderella!
 The Chipette Story
 Sisters
 Operation: Theodore
 Alvin and the Chipmunks: Driving Dave Crazier (August 20, 2013)
 Cookie Chomper III
 Grounded Chipmunk
 Whatever Happened to Dave Seville?
 A Chip Off the Old Tooth

20th Century Fox Home Entertainment (2007–2016) 
Alvin and the Chipmunks (2007 film) (April 1, 2008; Special Edition released in November 4, 2008)
Alvin and the Chipmunks: The Squeakquel (Blu-ray and DVD combo pack, standard DVD, double disc DVD and standard Blu-ray disc were released on March 30, 2010)
Alvin and the Chipmunks: Chipwrecked (Blu-ray and DVD combo pack, standard DVD, double disc DVD and standard Blu-ray disc were released on March 27, 2012)
Alvin and the Chipmunks: The Road Chip (Blu-ray and DVD combo pack, standard DVD, double disc DVD and standard Blu-ray disc were released on March 15, 2016)

Private Distributors

ANconnect, LLC (2015) 
The Alvin Show (March 10, 2015)
 Episode 1:
 Stanley the Eagle
 Oh, Gondanliero
 Clyde Crashcup Invents the Baseball
 I Wish I Could Speak French
 Episode 2:
 Ostrich
 The Brave Chipmunks
 Clyde Crashcup Invents the Baby
 Yankee Doodle
 Episode 3:
 Overworked Alvin
 Witch Doctor
 Clyde Crashcup Invents Flight
 The Chipmunk Song (Christmas Don't Be Late)

Bagdasarian Productions (owned unit; 2015–present) 
ALVINNN!!! and the Chipmunks: Alvin's Wild Adventures (November 11, 2015)
 Principal Interest
 Talking Teddy
 Mystic Mountain
 A is for Alien
 Clowning Around
 Driving Dave Crazy
 What a Gem
 ALVINNN!!! and the Chipmunks Season 1 Volume 1 (December 4, 2015)
 ALVINNN!!! and the Chipmunks Season 1 Volume 2 (January 26, 2016)
 ALVINNN!!! and the Chipmunks: Alvin vs. Brittany (March 1, 2016)
 Sister Act
 Albrittina
 My Sister, the Weirdo
 Mister Manners
 Reality or Not
 Turf War
 Don Juan Theodoro

References 

Alvin and the Chipmunks
Lists of home video releases
Television specials by Universal Cartoon Studios
Television series by Ruby-Spears
Television series by DIC Entertainment